Shanghai Daily (Chinese: 上海日报, Pinyin: Shànghǎi Rìbào) is an English-language newspaper founded in 1999 and owned by the Shanghai United Media Group, a state media company under the Shanghai committee of the Chinese Communist Party. It was the first daily newspaper in English in Shanghai.

In 2012, Shanghai Daily launched its iDealShanghai brand, aiming to offer its readers lifestyle information in Shanghai and neighboring cities.

On August 1, 2017, Shanghai Daily rebranded itself online as SHINE.

See also

List of newspapers in China
Mass media in China

References

External links

Newspapers published in Shanghai
English-language newspapers published in China
Publications established in 1999
State media
Chinese Communist Party newspapers